The Arab Center for Research and Policy Studies (can also be referred to by its acronyms as the ACRPS) is an Arab research institute with particular interest in the social sciences, applied social sciences, regional history and geostrategic affairs. To this effect, the ACRPS coordinates and develops research, publications, projects and events on issues and challenges relevant to the Arab world. The ACRPS primarily conducts its work in Arabic but publishes in both Arabic and English.

The ACRPS was established in 2010 and is based in Al Daayen, Qatar with a second office in Beirut, Lebanon. It is overseen by an executive board composed of Arab academics and intellectuals. The general director of the ACRPS is the Palestinian academic and politician Azmi Bishara.

Projects and programs 
The ACRPS hosts a number of projects and programs including the Arab Opinion Index, the Arab Prize on Social Sciences and Humanities, the Tarjuman Book Translation Unit, and the Doha Institute for Graduate Studies.

Arab Opinion Index 
In 2011, the Arab Opinion Index (AOI) was launched by the ACRPS. The project conducts polls in Arab countries in order to gauge public opinion on political, social and cultural issues. The aim of the AOI is to “annually and systematically measure Arab public opinion on a variety of issues of interest to the Arab masses.”

The Arab Prize for Social Sciences and Humanities 
In an effort to encourage Arab scholarship, the ACRPS established the Arab Prize for Social Sciences and Humanities. The results of this annual program are announced at the Annual Conference on the Social Sciences and Humanities whereby prizes are awarded to both established scholars and young researchers.

Tarjuman - Book Translation Unit 
The aim of the Book Translation Unit at the ACRPS is to make accessible to Arab researchers, high-quality contemporary works by non-Arab writers in the fields of economics, sociology, political science, management, culture and art. Translated works include Fanon: The Postcolonial Imagination by Nigel Gibson and Confronting Culture: Sociological Vistas by John Hughson and David Inglis.

Doha Institute for Graduate Studies 
In late 2013, the ACRPs announced the establishment of the Doha Institute for Graduate Studies (DI), an academic institute for postgraduate studies in the social sciences, humanities and public administration. The DI is expected to be operational in the fall of 2015.

According to the DI website, the institute “strives to prepare and qualify a select and competitively admitted body of students as capable academicians in advancing knowledge and public administration, and as professional leaders in the academic and executive fields”. The DI will include the School of Social Sciences and Humanities, the School of Public Administration and Policy, and the Doha Historical Dictionary of the Arabic Language. The ACRPS will also be located on the DI campus.

Publications 
The ACRPS publishes books and three Arabic academic periodicals, Omran, Tabayyun and Siyasat Arabia. Printed book titles include: The Sectarian Question and the Problem of Minorities by Burhan Ghalioun, Reflections on the Meaning of Palestine by Alain Gresh, Stay Human by Vittorio Arrigoni, and Civil Society by Azmi Bishara. Omran and Tabayyun are quarterly peer-reviewed journals, the former focused on the social sciences and the humanities more broadly, and the latter on thought, philosophy and cultural and literary criticism. Siyasat Arabia is published bi-monthly and is focused on political science, international relations and policy studies. It aims to make such analyses accessible to non-specialist audiences and contribute to public debate in Arab countries. Its contributions are primarily written by the ACRPS Policy Analysis Unit.

In addition a number of publications are made available electronically on the ACRPS website. These include select works from Omran and Tabayyun, policy analyses, case analyses, book reviews, assessment reports, and commentaries.

Events and conferences 
The ACRPS organizes two annual conferences which attract Arab researchers from across the region.
The Annual Conference on the Social Sciences and Humanities is generally held every March and addresses two research themes. Past themes were: “From Hampered Growth to Sustainable Development: Which Socio-economic Policies for Arab Countries?” and “Identity and Language in the Arab Homeland” (2012); and "The Dialectic of Social Integration and the Building of Nation and State in the Arab Homeland" and the "Definition of Justice in the Arab Homeland today" (2013).

The Annual Conference of Strategic and Policy Studies Research Centers in the Arab world brings together centers of research, policy studies, and strategic analysis in the Arab region. It is normally held in December of each year. Past themes of this conference were: “The Arab revolutions and geostrategic changes” (2012) and “The Cause of Palestine and the Future of the Palestinian National Movement” (2013).

In addition to the Annual Conferences, the ACRPS holds other conferences, symposia and lectures on various topics.

See also
 Derasat

References

External links
 
 Doha Institute Project

Think-tanks based in Qatar
Think tanks established in 2010
Non-profit organisations based in Qatar
2010 establishments in Qatar
Organisations based in Doha